The Agusta A.101 (originally designated AZ.101) was a large prototype transport helicopter developed in Italy during the 1960s. Despite prospective orders from the Italian armed forces, no buyers emerged and the project was abandoned in 1971.

Design and development
The A.101 was of conventional, single-rotor configuration with tricycle undercarriage and powered by triple turboshaft engines. The fuselage was provided with a rear loading ramp and two large sliding troop doors.

The final stage in the A.101's development was to stretch the fuselage by 3 m (10 ft) and upgrade the engines to the more powerful General Electric T58. This resulted in a marked improvement in performance, but in the end, the Italian government opted for variants of the SH-3 Sea King, licence-built by Agusta instead of their own design.

The single prototype is stored for preservation at the Museo Agusta at Cascina Costa.

Variants
A.101DThe original concept by Filippo Zappata exhibited in model form at the Milan Trade Fair in April 1958, also designated AZ.101, acknowledging Zappata's role in the design process. Power was to have been supplied by three  Turbomeca Turmo engines.
A.101GThe sole prototype powered by three  Rolls-Royce Gnome H.1400 turboshaft engines

Specifications (A.101G configuration)

See also

References

Further reading

 
 

Agusta aircraft
1960s Italian military transport aircraft
1960s Italian helicopters
Three-turbine helicopters
Aircraft first flown in 1964
Military transport helicopters